Liolaemus pulcherrimus is a species of lizard in the family Iguanidae.  It is endemic to Argentina.

References

pulcherrimus
Lizards of South America
Reptiles of Argentina
Endemic fauna of Argentina
Reptiles described in 1992
Taxa named by Raymond Laurent